Miklós Barcza (7 January 1908 – 11 July 1948) was a Hungarian ice hockey player. He played for the Hungarian national team at the 1928 and 1936 Winter Olympics and at the World Championships.

References

External links
 

1908 births
1948 deaths
Hungarian ice hockey defencemen
Ice hockey players at the 1928 Winter Olympics
Ice hockey players at the 1936 Winter Olympics
Olympic ice hockey players of Hungary
Ice hockey people from Budapest